Delvechio Blackson (born 26 February 1995) is a Dutch professional footballer who plays as a left back for Telstar. He formerly played for SC Cambuur and Almere City.

Club career
Blackson made his professional debut in the Eerste Divisie for SC Cambuur on 9 September 2016 in a game against Almere City FC.

On 25 June 2021, Blackson signed with SC Telstar, after having played for Almere City for four seasons.

Personal life
Born in the Netherlands, Blackson is of Surinamese descent.

Career statistics

References

External links
 

Living people
1995 births
Footballers from Zaanstad
Association football fullbacks
Dutch footballers
Dutch sportspeople of Surinamese descent
SC Cambuur players
Almere City FC players
SC Telstar players
Eerste Divisie players
Derde Divisie players